Mian Choqa (also Romanized as Mīān Choqā, Mīān Chaqā, and Mīyān Cheqā) is a village in Mansuri Rural District, Homeyl District, Eslamabad-e Gharb County, Kermanshah Province, Iran. At the 2006 census, its population was 92, in 20 families.

References 

Populated places in Eslamabad-e Gharb County